Jakub Wójcicki (born 9 July 1988) is a Polish professional footballer who plays as a right-back for Polish club Znicz Pruszków.

Career
On 20 July 2013, he made his Ekstraklasa debut coming on as substitute in a match against Cracovia.

On 11 January 2018, Wójcicki signed a two and a half year contract with Jagiellonia Białystok.

On 31 July 2020, he moved to Zagłębie Lubin.

On 21 October 2022, Wójcicki was registered to play in II liga for his childhood club Znicz Pruszków.

Honours
Zawisza Bydgoszcz
 Polish Cup: 2013–14
 Polish Super Cup: 2014

References

External links 
 
 

1988 births
Living people
Footballers from Warsaw
Association football midfielders
Polish footballers
Zawisza Bydgoszcz players
MKS Cracovia (football) players
Jagiellonia Białystok players
Zagłębie Lubin players
Znicz Pruszków players
Ekstraklasa players
I liga players
III liga players